“Heart and Soul” is the debut single by British pop rock ensemble T'Pau, released in 1987 from their debut album Bridge of Spies. Following its inclusion in a Pepe Jeans advert, the single reached No. 4 in both the US and UK charts.

Background
Singer Carol Decker said of the authorship and composition of the selection:

Song information
The song is notable for its usage of various vocal overdubs, causing Decker, essentially, to be duetting with herself on the original studio recording. This makes the song, in its initial studio form, impossible to perform live without additional backup singers. Instead, Decker often performs what she calls a "basic" version, explaining to Songfacts: "I rap the first two verses then cut to the melody for the verse before the chorus. No one really notices or minds as I cover the essential dynamics of the song. It works well."

Upon its initial release in the UK in February 1987, the song was not well received, entering the bottom of the chart and falling out immediately after. But in the United States, the song received heavy airplay, and the Pepe Jeans advertisement enabled it to reach No. 4 on the Billboard Hot 100 in August 1987. Due to the exposure, the song was re-released in the UK that same month; this time it became a hit, equaling the US peak of No. 4 in September.

There are two different versions of the Music Video, one made later than the other, both visible on YouTube.

Packaging and title
The single artwork was designed by graphic designer Adrian Fry.

Cultural references
 The song was featured on the soundtrack for the video game Grand Theft Auto: Episodes from Liberty City and was featured in the opening credits of the 2017 film Don't Talk to Irene.
 The song featured in the episode "San Junipero" of the Netflix series Black Mirror, written and created by Charlie Brooker.
 The song featured in the 2019 comedy horror film We Summon the Darkness. 
 Insane Clown Posse released a cover of the song on their 2021 album "Yum Yum Bedlam"

Charts

Weekly charts

Year-end charts

Heart and Soul '97

References

External links

1986 songs
1987 debut singles
T'Pau (band) songs
RPM Top Singles number-one singles
Song recordings produced by Roy Thomas Baker
Songs written by Carol Decker
Songs written by Ron Rogers
Virgin Records singles